Phikkal is a Rural municipality located within the Sindhuli District of the Bagmati Province of Nepal.
The municipality spans  of area, with a total population of 16,968 according to a 2011 Nepal census.

On March 10, 2017, the Government of Nepal restructured the local level bodies into 753 new local level structures.
The previous Mahadevdada, Sunam Pokhari, Kholagaun, Khang Sang, Solpathana and Ratnawati VDCs were merged to form Phikkal Rural Municipality.
Phikkal is divided into 6 wards, with Khang Sang declared the administrative center of the rural municipality.

References

External links
official website of the rural municipality

Rural municipalities in Sindhuli District
Rural municipalities of Nepal established in 2017